Helen Mary Smith (25 May 1927 – 26 December 2007) was a Porirua, New Zealand city councillor from 1973 until 2001. Smith was also the runner-up in the 1977 mayoral election in Porirua.

Smith was an activist in Porirua over several community issues. From 1980 to 2001, when she was narrowly defeated (leaving no artists on the council) Smith was chairperson of the Community Development Committee, which saw her responsible for the library services in Porirua, widely considered to be excellent. She was also strong supporter for the Pataka Complex and an art gallery in Porirua. The Porirua City Council has named a room in the local Pataka Museum and a prize after her.

She lived in Titahi Bay with her husband Dr Allan Smith and had four children and numerous grandchildren.

References

External links
http://natlib.govt.nz/records/22382043?search%5Bpath%5D=items&search%5Btext%5D=Helen+Smith+Porirua+Values+Party
http://natlib.govt.nz/records/23062058?search%5Bpath%5D=items&search%5Btext%5D=Helen+Smith+Porirua+Values+Party
http://www.stuff.co.nz/dominion-post/news/local-papers/kapi-mana-news/3910348/Pukerua-Bay-artist-seeks-seat-on-Porirua-council
Helen Smith Family Award
 U.S. The Spokesman-Review, 9 September 1973, "Helen Smith is the first elected representative of a new political party which sent shock-waves through both the established parties at New Zealand's general election, and which each of them would dearly love to assimilate before next time."
two references to her from Index NZ; Evening Post 10 September 2001 p18 & Dominion Post 17 January 2008 pB7. 

1927 births
2007 deaths
Porirua City Councillors
21st-century New Zealand women politicians
Values Party politicians
People from Porirua
20th-century New Zealand politicians
20th-century New Zealand women politicians
Unsuccessful candidates in the 1972 New Zealand general election
Unsuccessful candidates in the 1975 New Zealand general election
Unsuccessful candidates in the 1978 New Zealand general election
Unsuccessful candidates in the 1981 New Zealand general election